Ipswich Gymnastics Centre in Ipswich is one of only three fully London Organising Committee for the Olympic Games (LOCOG) accredited gymnastics facilities in the United Kingdom and was used for training sessions in the run up to the 2004 Olympic Games by the Romanian gymnastics team.

International competitions
The centre has hosted international competitions and friendlies.

GB vs. Romania
In June 2008, two weeks before selection for the British gymnastics team for the 2008 Summer Olympics were to be announced, the centre held a competition with the 3 time Olympic winning Romania, with Marissa King, Beckie Downie, Rebecca Wing, Hannah Whelan, Lauren Doyle, Laura Jones, Hannah Clowes and Imogen Cairns representing Great Britain. Romania were represented by Steliana Nistor, Sandra Izbaşa, Andreea Acatrinei, Andreea Grigore, Daniela Druncea and Gabriela Drăgoi (Anamaria Tămârjan had to pull out on the day)

Notable alumni
 Rosalie Hutton member of the Scottish 2006 Commonwealth Games team
 Polina Polyakova - England National Team member

References

External links
 Pipers Vale Gymnastics Club website

Sports venues in Ipswich
Gymnastics organizations
Gymnastics in the United Kingdom
Gymnastics clubs